The Canadian University Dubai, popularly known as CUD, is a private university in Dubai, United Arab Emirates, founded in 2006. The Canadian University Dubai offers education based on the Canadian curriculum. The university has recently opened a new campus located in the heart of Dubai, in City Walk.

The university was originally known as Centennial University of Dubai. This title was changed to Canadian University Dubai once it became an independent Canadian institution. The university maintains its ties with the original Ontario-based Centennial College, offering students transfer programs after their second year.

Faculties
Canadian University Dubai is composed of four faculties. While graduate programs are offered separately, the faculties and all of the programs offered have both Canadian and Emirati accreditation.

Architecture and Interior Design
Communication Arts and Sciences
Engineering, Applied Science and Technology
Management

Learning Resource Centre 
The Learning Resource Centre, located on the ground floor of Building A of the university campus, houses over 10,000 print collections, including books, journals, newspapers and electronic resources.

See also 
 Education in the United Arab Emirates
 Centennial College

References

External links
Canadian University Dubai Transfer and exchange partners

Educational institutions established in 2006
Universities and colleges in Dubai
2006 establishments in the United Arab Emirates